Timbuktu is a city in Mali.

Timbuktu and similarly spelled words may also refer to:

Places
Timbuktu is a common placeholder name for a distant and remote location.  Specific locations include:
 Timbuctoo, California, a ghost town and unincorporated community in Yuba County, California, U.S.
 Timbuctoo, New Jersey, a small settlement along Rancocas Creek in Westampton Township, New Jersey, U.S.
 Timbuctoo, New York, a failed farming community of Black people in the Adirondacks.
 Timbuktu (crater), an old crater on Mars
 Timbuktu, Oregon, a historic locale in Washington County, Oregon, U.S.
 Tombouctou Region, administrative subdivision of Mali

People
 Timbuktu (hip hop artist), Canadian hip hop artist
 Timbuktu (musician), Swedish rapper, reggae and hip hop artist

Art, entertainment, and media

Film
 Timboektoe (2007), a Dutch youth film
 Timbuctoo (film), a 1933 British film
 Timbuktu (1959 film), a 1959 film with Victor Mature
 Timbuktu, a 2004 film directed by Alan Gilsenan
 Timbuktu (2014 film), a 2014 French-Mauritanian film

Literature
 Timbuctoo, an 1829 poem by William Makepeace Thackeray
 Timbuctoo (novel), a 2012 novel by Tahir Shah
 Timbuctoo, a series of children books by Roger Hargreaves, based on Mr Men and Little Miss, first published in 1978
 Timbuktu (novella), a book written by Paul Auster
 The Train to Timbuctoo, a 1951 picture book by Margaret Wise Brown

Music
 Timbuktu!, a musical play

Brands and enterprises
 Timbuktu (software), a remote control software product
 Timbuk2, a line of messenger bags

See also
 Tombouctou (disambiguation)